Han Hye-yong  ( or  ; born ) is a female North Korean football goalkeeper.

She was part of the North Korea women's national football team  at the 2008 Summer Olympics. On club level she played for Pyongyang City.

See also
 North Korea at the 2008 Summer Olympics

References

External links
http://www.theage.com.au/news/soccer/north-korean-missiles-fly-on-soccer-battlefield/2006/07/28/1153816383677.html
http://www.theage.com.au/news/soccer/women-turn-on-ref-in-soccer-brawl/2006/07/28/1153816355610.html
http://english.donga.com/List/3/all/26/248722/1
https://goal.blogs.nytimes.com/2007/09/10/the-north-korea-women-angry-for-a-reason/?_r=0

1985 births
Living people
North Korean women's footballers
Place of birth missing (living people)
Footballers at the 2008 Summer Olympics
Olympic footballers of North Korea
Women's association football goalkeepers
North Korea women's international footballers